The Last Resort is the second EP released by American country music band Midland. The EP includes the singles "Sunrise Tells the Story", "And Then Some", "Take Her Off Your Hands", "Adios Cowboy" and "Two To Two Step". It was released through Big Machine Records, and produced by Dann Huff, Shane McAnally and Josh Osborne. The EP was expanded into a full album, The Last Resort: Greetings From, which was released in 2022.

Background 
The EP was recorded during the Coronavirus pandemic and the band has said that these songs may appear on their third studio album, that is yet to be announced. Along with the EP, Midland announced The Last Resort Tour to promote the new EP.

Critical reception 
The EP received generally positive reviews from critics. Mark Wiggins from Six Shooter Country gave the EP a 7 out of 10, and said that the EP seems to drift more towards mainstream and is a development in Midland's sound. James Daykin from Lyric Magazine said "we see the band experimenting with a more chilled, laid back Eagles-like vibe", and gave the EP a generally positive review.

Track listing

Personnel
Adapted from liner notes.

Midland
Jess Carson - acoustic guitar, background vocals
Cameron Duddy - bass guitar, background vocals
Mark Wystrach - lead vocals

Additional Musicians
Dave Cohen - mellotron, piano, synthesizer
Robbie Crowell - Hammond B-3 organ, keyboards, synthesizer
Paul Franklin - steel guitar
Dann Huff - acoustic guitar, electric guitar
David Huff - programming
Evan Hutchings - programming
Laur Joamets - electric guitar
Cormac O'Rourke - electric guitar 
Charlie Judge - Hammond B-3 organ, keyboards, synthesizer, synthesizer bass
Rob McNelley - electric guitar
Greg Morrow - drums, percussion
Justin Niebank - programming
Ben Phillips - programming
Ilya Toshinsky - acoustic guitar

References

Midland (band) albums
2021 EPs
Big Machine Records EPs
Albums produced by Dann Huff
Albums produced by Shane McAnally